Inter praecipuas apostolici ministerii was a papal bull issued by Pope Clement XII, on 17 December 1737, establishing that whoever was appointed Patriarch of Lisbon was to be elevated to the rank of cardinal in the next consistory. Lisbon remains the only episcopal see accorded this distinction. Others like the Patriarch of Venice are made cardinals in the consistory following their appointment, but only by tradition.

Popes until Pope Francis honored this commitment. Though he named Manuel Clemente Patriarch of Lisbon in May 2013, he did not make him a cardinal in the next consistory in February 2014 but waited until he held another consistory for creating cardinals in February 2015.

References

1737 works
18th-century papal bulls
Documents of Pope Clement XII